The 1916 SMU Mustangs football team was an American football team that represented the Southern Methodist University (SMU) as a member of the Texas Intercollegiate Athletic Association (TIAA) during the 1916 college football season. In its second season under head coach Ray Morrison, the team compiled an overall record of 0–8–2and was outscored by a total of 455 to 27.

Schedule

References

SMU
SMU Mustangs football seasons
College football winless seasons
SMU Mustangs football